Purie is a surname. Notable people with the surname include:

Aroon Purie (born 1944), Indian businessman, publisher, and editor-in-chief
Koel Purie (born 1978), Indian film actress, producer, and television presenter

See also
Purce
Purje
Urie (name)